Malin Lundgren  (born 9 March 1967) is a Swedish footballer who played as a defender for the Sweden women's national football team. She was part of the team at the 1991 FIFA Women's World Cup and 1995 FIFA Women's World Cup. At the club level she played for Malmö FF in Sweden.

References

External links
 

1967 births
Living people
Swedish women's footballers
Sweden women's international footballers
Place of birth missing (living people)
1991 FIFA Women's World Cup players
1995 FIFA Women's World Cup players
Women's association football defenders